The Tuwairqi Steel Mills Limited (TSML), is a vertically integrated multinational Steel mill, based in Karachi, Sindh,  Pakistan.

An environmentally friendly and established by a private sector, the steel mill is co-financed by the Al-Tuwairqi Holdings (Saudi Arabia), POSCO (South Korea)  and the Arif Habib Group owners of downstream facility Aisha Steel Mills (Pakistan), and currently aiming to compete against the Pakistan Steel Mills (PSM) at the Karachi Stock Exchange (KSE) indexes.

Pakistan refused to supply the gas to the company and Saudi Arabia decided to provide the gas to the company on cheaper rate. The Tuwarqi Management warned to disassemble and shift the plant to Saudi Arabia. The Karachi Chamber of Commerce and Industry (KCCI) President Iftikhar Ahmad Vohra requested Federal Minister Ishaq Dar to resolve the issue of gas supply to the TSML.

Capacity
Its production capacity  is 1.28 million tons of steel per annum.

See also
 Pakistan Steel Mills
 Ittefaq Group
 Aisha Steel Mills

External links
 Tuwairqi Steel Mills Limited

References 

Manufacturing companies based in Karachi
Steel companies of Pakistan
Pakistani subsidiaries of foreign companies
Privately held companies of Pakistan